My Village People is a 2021 Nigerian comedy supernatural thriller film written by Bovi Ugboma and directed by Niyi Akinmolayan. The film stars Bovi, Nkem Owoh, Amaechi Muonagor and Charles Inojie in the lead roles. The film was premiered at the Filmhouse Cinemas in Lagos on 6 June 2021 and the film had its theatrical release on 11 June 2021.

Synopsis 
Prince, a young man whose weaknesses for women eventually lands him in trouble as he is caught in a bizarre love triangle with witches and marine spirits.

Cast 

 Bovi as Prince
 Nkem Owoh as Prof Pium
 Theresa Edem as Haggai
 Amaechi Muonagor as Ndio
 Charles Inojie as Uncle Jakpa
 Sophie Alakija as Ame
 Rachael Oniga as Witch 1
 Ada Ameh as Witch 2
 Binta Ayo Mogaji as Witch 3
 Venita Akpofure as Princess
 Zubby Michael as Bishop Divine
 Akah Nnani as Driver
 Mimi Onalaja as Mrs Okafor

Production 
The film was produced in collaboration with Kountry Kulture Network, FilmOne Entertainment and TMPL Motion Pictures. The  principal photography of the film began in January 2021 and the first look poster of the film was unveiled by Bovi in April 2021.

Controversy 
Despite the box office success, the writer of the film Bovi who also played the lead role had accused the director Niyi Akinmolayan of being egoistic, clout chaser and inferiority complex driven film director. Bovi expressed his dissatisfaction working with Akinmolayan in a social media post on 3 July 2021 nearly a month after the theatrical release of the film.

References 

2021 films
Nigerian thriller films
2021 comedy films
2021 thriller films
English-language Nigerian films
2020s English-language films
Nigerian comedy-drama films